Heloridae is a family of wasps in the order Hymenoptera known primarily from fossils, and only one extant genus, Helorus, with 12 species found worldwide. Members of Helorus are parasitic on green lacewings.

Extant genera
Helorus (12 spp. worldwide)

Fossil genera
†Archaeohelorus Daohugou, China, Middle Jurassic (Callovian)
†Bellohelorus Li et al. 2017 Yixian Formation, China, Early Cretaceous (Aptian)
†Conohelorus Turga, Russia, Early Cretaceous (Aptian)
†Laiyanghelorus Zhang 1992 Laiyang Formation, Yixian Formation, China, Early Cretaceous (Aptian)
†Liaoropronia Zhang and Zhang 2001 Yixian Formation, China, Early Cretaceous (Aptian)
†Novhelorus Li et al. 2017 Yixian Formation, China, Early Cretaceous (Aptian)
†Obconohelorus Rasnitsyn 1990 Turga, Russia, Early Cretaceous (Aptian)
†Protocyrtus Karabastau Formation, Kazakhstan, Middle-Late Jurassic (Callovian/Oxfordian) Gurvan-Eren Formation, Mongolia Yixian Formation, China, Turga, Russia, Early Cretaceous (Aptian)
†Sinohelorus Shi et al. 2013 Yixian Formation, China, Early Cretaceous (Aptian)
†Sinuijuhelorus Jon et al. 2019 Sinuiju Formation, North Korea, Early Cretaceous (Aptian)
†Spherogaster Zhang and Zhang 2001 Yixian Formation, China, Early Cretaceous (Aptian)

References

Further reading

 
 
 
 
 
 
 
 

Proctotrupoidea